France participated at the Eurovision Song Contest 1958, held in Hilversum, the Netherlands, Wednesday 12 March 1958.

Before Eurovision 
Radiodiffusion-Télévision Française (RTF) internally selected André Claveau to sing for France, with the song being selected in a national final. The final took place on 2 February 1958 at Gaumont Film Studios in Neuilly-sur-Seine and was hosted by Marianne Lecène. The winning song of the final was selected by the votes of juries arranged by 14 musicians.

National final

At Eurovision 
Claveau sang third on the night of the contest, following the Netherlands and preceding Luxembourg. At the close of the voting he received 27 points, placing first of 10 countries, and giving France their first victory at the contest.

Voting 
Every country had a jury of ten people. Every jury member could give one point to his or her favourite song.

References

French National Final 1958

1958
Countries in the Eurovision Song Contest 1958
Eurovision